Stanley Lee (1899-1986), was an English bowls player who competed at the Commonwealth Games.

Bowls career
He participated in the 1954 British Empire and Commonwealth Games at Vancouver, British Columbia, Canada in the singles and the fours/rinks events and finishing  in 8th and 10th place respectively.

Personal life
He was an electrical engineer by trade and lived in Hitchin.

References

English male bowls players
Bowls players at the 1954 British Empire and Commonwealth Games
1899 births
1986 deaths
Sportspeople from Hitchin
Commonwealth Games competitors for England